Events in the year 1696 in India.

Events
National income - ₹7,877 million
Building of the fort of Calcutta.

References

 
India